Esther Jeanne Moellering Tomljanovich (born November 1, 1931) is an American lawyer and judge who served as an associate justice of the Minnesota Supreme Court.

Early life and education 
Tomljanovich was born in Galt, Iowa. She moved with her parents to Buck Lake in Itasca County, Minnesota. She earned her law degree from William Mitchell College of Law (then the St. Paul College of Law) in 1955.

Career 
Tomljanovich served on the Lake Elmo Planning Commission and on North St. Paul-Maplewood School Board. From 1957 to 1977, she worked in the Minnesota Office of the Revisor of Statutes, first as Assistant Revisor and then as Revisor. She served as a state district court judge in Washington County from 1977 to 1990, when Governor Rudy Perpich appointed her to the Minnesota Supreme Court. Tomljanovich served on the Minnesota Supreme Court until her retirement in 1998. She joined the Medica Board of Directors in 2002 and stills serves on that board.

Personal life 
Tomljanovich married her husband, Bill Tomljanovich, in 1957. She lived in Lake Elmo, Minnesota, with her husband and family.

References

1931 births
Living people
People from Wright County, Iowa
People from Lake Elmo, Minnesota
William Mitchell College of Law alumni
Minnesota state court judges
Minnesota lawyers
Justices of the Minnesota Supreme Court
School board members in Minnesota
20th-century American women judges
20th-century American judges
American women judges
20th-century American women lawyers
20th-century American lawyers